Oak Grove Cemetery is a historic cemetery on 7th Street in Des Arc, Arkansas.  Established in the 1850s, it is the city's oldest cemetery, occupying about  now hemmed in by development.  It has 182 documented historic burials, and is one of its few surviving pre-Civil War elements.  Most of its interments took place before 1930, and there have been none since 1970.

The cemetery was listed on the National Register of Historic Places in 2001.

See also
 National Register of Historic Places listings in Prairie County, Arkansas

References

External links
 

Cemeteries on the National Register of Historic Places in Arkansas
Buildings and structures in Prairie County, Arkansas
National Register of Historic Places in Prairie County, Arkansas
Cemeteries established in the 1850s